The FUTE Lions football program represents the University of Teacher Education Fukuoka in college football. FUTE is a member of the Kyūshū Collegiate American Football Association.

External links
 
American football in Japan